Jędrzejowice may refer to the following places in Poland:
Jędrzejowice, Dzierżoniów County in Lower Silesian Voivodeship (south-west Poland)
Jędrzejowice, Świętokrzyskie Voivodeship (south-central Poland)